David Hulme (born 6 February 1964) is an English former professional rugby league footballer who played in the 1980s and 1990s.

Having started his playing career at St Bede's RC Junior School, David moved to St Joseph's RC Comprehensive in Widnes (where he played Centre for their RU team i.e. 13 or 14) whilst continuing playing Amateur Rugby League for Halton Hornets in a set up that also produced future Widnes team mates Barry Dowd (1982–93) and Andy Currier.

His first taste of the "limelight" was in the Widnes Under-11 team that won the "Curtain raiser" to the 1975 Challenge Cup Final, when Widnes played Warrington, and won the "Main Event" 14-7.

Playing career

Widnes
David Hulme played as a substitute, i.e. number 14, in Widnes' 19–6 victory over Wigan in the 1984 Challenge Cup Final during the 1983–84 season at Wembley Stadium, London on Saturday 5 May 1984, in front of a crowd of 80,116.

David Hulme played, and was man of the match winning the Harry Sunderland Trophy in Widnes' 38-14 victory over St. Helens in the Premiership Final during the 1987–88 season at Old Trafford on Sunday 15 May 1988. Hulme played , scored a try, and was man of the match in Widnes' 30-18 victory over Canberra Raiders in the 1989 World Club Challenge at Old Trafford, Manchester on Wednesday 4 October 1989. Hulme played  in Widnes' 24-18 victory over Salford in the 1990 Lancashire County Cup Final during the 1990–91 season at Central Park, Wigan on Saturday 29 September 1990. Hulme played  in Widnes' 6-12 defeat by Wigan in the 1988–89 John Player Special Trophy Final during the 1988–89 season at Burnden Park, Bolton on Saturday 7 January 1989. Hulme's Testimonial match at Widnes took place in 1991.

Leeds
Hulme joined Leeds in 1996, making nine appearances and scoring two tries for the club in Super League I.

International honours
David Hulme won caps for Great Britain while at Widnes in 1988 against Papua New Guinea, Australia (3 matches), and New Zealand, and in 1989 against New Zealand (3 matches). Hulme was selected to go on the 1988 Great Britain Lions tour.

Genealogical information
David Hulme is the older brother of the rugby league footballer, Paul Hulme, and is the father of the rugby league footballer Danny Hulme who scored the fastest hat trick of tries for Widnes Vikings against Halifax in 2011.

References

External links
!Great Britain Statistics at englandrl.co.uk (statistics currently missing due to not having appeared for both Great Britain, and England)
Profile at rugby.widnes.tv

1964 births
Living people
English rugby league coaches
English rugby league players
Great Britain national rugby league team players
Leeds Rhinos players
Rugby league five-eighths
Rugby league halfbacks
Rugby league players from Widnes
Salford Red Devils players
Widnes Vikings coaches
Widnes Vikings players